Chiplust is a tribute album by Inverse Phase, released on August 8, 2014.
The cover art was created by Pete Amador III, a graphic artist from the Corpus Christi bay area.
Len Stuart also contributed artwork featured on the rear cover.

Track listing

External links
 Chiplust on Bandcamp
 Official Inverse Phase website
 Len Stuart website

Inverse Phase albums
2014 albums
Tribute albums